Share permissions can be implemented on NTFS and FAT file systems for shared resource.
Different permissions are Read, Change and Full control.
Permissions are also implemented on Samba.

See also
File system permissions

References

Share Permissions
Windows 2003 NTFS and Share Permissions

Notes

Windows disk file systems